The Originals, an American supernatural drama, was renewed for a third season by The CW on January 11, 2015. The season premiered on October 8, 2015.

Cast

Main 
 Joseph Morgan as Niklaus "Klaus" Mikaelson
 Daniel Gillies as Elijah Mikaelson
 Phoebe Tonkin as Hayley Marshall
 Charles Michael Davis as Marcellus "Marcel" Gerard
 Leah Pipes as Camille "Cami" O'Connell
 Danielle Campbell as Davina Claire
 Yusuf Gatewood as Vincent Griffith
 Riley Voelkel as Freya Mikaelson

Recurring 
 Nathaniel Buzolic as Kol Mikaelson
 Andrew Lees as Lucien Castle
 Oliver Ackland as Tristan de Martel
 Rebecca Breeds as Aurora de Martel
 Caspar Zafer as Finn Mikaelson
 Jason Dohring as Detective Will Kinney
 Stephanie Cleough as Alexis
 Joyce Thi Brew as Kara Nguyen
 Nathan Parsons as Jackson Kenner
 Lawrence Kao as Van Nguyen
 Steven Krueger as Joshua "Josh" Rosza
 Tracy Ifeachor as Aya Al-Rashid
 Haley Ramm as Ariane

Special guest 
 Claire Holt as Rebekah Mikaelson
 Paul Wesley as Stefan Salvatore
 Zach Roerig as Matt Donovan

Guest 
 Jaylen Moore as Mohinder
 Maisie Richardson-Sellers as Eva Sinclair (possessed by Rebekah Mikaelson)
 Antwan Mills as Anton
 Debra Mooney as Mary Dumas
 Rebecca Blumhagen as Madison
 Leslie-Anne Huff as Rayna Cruz
 Matt Cedeño as Gaspar Cortez
 Taylor Cole as Sofya Voronova
 Dan Martin as Hollis

Notes

Episodes

Ratings

References 

3
2015 American television seasons
2016 American television seasons